On 6 July 2013, a time-device bomb blast occurred in the food street of the Old Anarkali district, in the eastern city of Lahore, Pakistan. The blast killed five people and injured dozens of others.

Background
Lahore, the second largest city of Pakistan, an important political, economic and cultural center of the country, and capital of the Punjab province, has been relatively free of violence and terrorism compared to other parts of the country. The food street attack was the first major incident of terrorism in the city in three years. The Anarkali food street area comes under the NA-120 constituency of the National Assembly, from where Prime Minister Nawaz Sharif, a native of Lahore, contested and emerged victorious in the 2013 general election.

Incident
The blast was triggered by a time-device bomb. The blast occurred on the night of Saturday on 6 July 2013. Two people died on the spot while three succumbed to their injuries at Mayo Hospital on Sunday, bringing the death toll to five. The deaths were confirmed by police and Rescue 1122 officials. Mirza Taimoor, a student of GC  university Lahore was also injured severely in this incident.

Investigations
Police rounded up over 200 suspects, most of them Afghan nationals, during an operation a day after the incident. Two injured brothers, said to hail from the Bajaur Agency in the northwestern tribal areas, were also interrogated. Late on Sunday, police reported that a group called the Baloch Liberation Tigers (BLT) claimed responsibility for the attack. The BLT is said to be a splinter Baloch militant group involved in the insurgency in Balochistan.

References

2013 murders in Pakistan
21st-century mass murder in Pakistan
Terrorist incidents in Lahore
Terrorist incidents in Pakistan in 2013
Balochistan Liberation Army attacks
Improvised explosive device bombings in Pakistan
Mass murder in 2013
July 2013 events in Pakistan
Marketplace attacks in Asia